Mount Taron (also spelt Tahron) or Mount Agil is the highest point in the Hans Meyer Range on New Ireland in Papua New Guinea. It is the highest point of New Ireland and the entire Bismarck Archipelago.

References

Taron, Mount